Surattha albostigmata is a moth in the family Crambidae. It was described by Rothschild in 1921. It is found in Niger.

References

Ancylolomiini
Moths described in 1921
Endemic fauna of Niger